Red Top is an unincorporated community in Edwards County, Illinois, United States. The settlement name comes from Agrostis gigantea, or Redtop Wildgrass that grows in the Illinois region. The community is one quarter-mile south of Illinois Route 15. A 3.8-magnitude earthquake occurred eight miles outside of the city on September 19, 2017. The Norfolk Southern Railway runs through the community.

References

Unincorporated communities in Edwards County, Illinois
Unincorporated communities in Illinois